Vansant or VanSant may refer to:

Places
 Vansant, Virginia (pop. 989 in 2000),  a census-designated place in Buchanan County, Virginia, U.S.
 Vansant Airport (aka Van Sant Airport), in Bucks County, Pennsylvania, U.S.
 Vansant Island or Vansant Island (Delaware), in the list of islands of the United States
 John C. Vansant House, in the National Register of Historic Places listings in northern New Castle County, Delaware
 Vansant Circus, fictional employer of comics superhero The Moth

People
  (born 1954), a Flemish-Belgian psychotherapist
 Charles Vansant, first victim of the Jersey Shore shark attacks of 1916
 Henry Vansant, 1980–1983 football coach of the Lenoir–Rhyne Bears
 J. R. Vansant, eponym of William Gaddis's 1975 novel J R

Other
 Vansant v. Gas-Light Company, a 1875 U. S. Supreme Court case

See also
 Van Sant (disambiguation)
 Van Zant (disambiguation)
 Van Zandt (disambiguation)